The 1999 UCI Road World Championships took place in Treviso and Verona, Italy, between October 3 and October 10, 1999. The event consisted of a road race and a time trial for men, women, men under 23, junior men and junior women.

Events summary

External links 
Results and report of cyclingnews.com

 
UCI Road World Championships by year
Uci Road World Championships
World Championships
UCI Road World Championships